Cynthia Schreiber-Beck (born December 13, 1954) is an American politician who has served in the North Dakota House of Representatives from the 25th district since 2014.

References

1954 births
Living people
Republican Party members of the North Dakota House of Representatives
21st-century American politicians
21st-century American women politicians
People from Wahpeton, North Dakota
Women state legislators in North Dakota